Eley can mean:

Eley (name), list of people with the name Eley
Eley Industrial Estate, in Edmonton, London
Eley Kishimoto, British fashion and design company
Eley Limited (formerly Eley Brothers), ammunition manufacturer in Sutton Coldfield, England
Eley Peak, small rock peak in the Ellsworth Mountains in Antarctica
Eley, Şereflikoçhisar, village in Ankara, Turkey

See also
Ely (disambiguation)
Ili (disambiguation)